Barney Bush (birth name Bernard Bush; September 30, 2000 – February 1, 2013) was a Scottish Terrier owned by former U.S. President George W. Bush and former First Lady Laura Bush. Barney had his own official web page which redirected to an extension of the White House website. Barney was born in New Jersey and he was often referred to as the "First Dog".

Family
Barney's mother, Coors, was owned by former Environmental Protection Agency Director and former New Jersey Governor Christine Todd Whitman. The dog's father is known as Kelly. Miss Beazley, the Bushes' other Scottish terrier, is Barney's niece through his half-brother, Clinton.

Interests

Barney is said to have enjoyed playing with volleyballs and golf balls, and enjoyed observing games of horseshoes. There are various web sites across the Internet devoted to Barney. Most notably, he was the main star of the White House's annual Christmas videos during the Bush administration.

Barney was featured in several films that go by the name of Barneycam and are made by the White House Staff, and star both Barney himself and Miss Beazley, the other presidential canine. These movies can be found on the George W. Bush archived White House web site.

Media attention

Bob Woodward quotes Bush about Barney 
Barney was evoked in a famous Bush quote cited by Bob Woodward about the Iraq War in State of Denial: Bush at War, Part III and repeated during a 60 Minutes interview:

Criticism by Karl Rove and Vladimir Putin 
White House official Karl Rove remarked shortly after his resignation that Barney was "a lump." Barney has also been criticized by Russian President Vladimir Putin who feels a world leader should own large robust dogs, not smaller breeds such as the Scottish Terrier. At a later date, when Putin introduced Bush to Koni, his black labrador, Putin is reported to have remarked that Koni is "(b)igger, tougher, stronger, faster, meaner, than Barney."

Satires 
On November 27, 2006, Barney was featured in an article in satirical newspaper The Onion titled "Troop Morale Boosted By Surprise Visit From First Dog". The article described a fictitious visit by Barney to troops in Iraq.

On December 14, 2006, The Daily Show satirized Barney's Holiday Extravaganza.
Barney was, at one point, satirized in "The Bugle".

On January 23, 2007, Scottie Tails posted a satire video of a Wheaten-colored terrier named Kenzie asking Barney to contact her about a date.

Bites 

On November 6, 2008, Barney bit Reuters news reporter Jon Decker's finger. Barney had bitten Boston Celtics public relations director Heather Walker on the wrist on September 19, 2008, breaking the skin and drawing blood, but the incident was not reported until after the November 4 elections.  Laura Bush's spokesperson joked afterwards that "I think it was his way of saying he was done with the paparazzi."

Death
Barney was euthanized due to lymphoma.

On February 1, 2013, Bush posted this to his Facebook page,
Statement by President George W. Bush on the passing of Barney Bush:

Barney was survived by the Bushes' other Scottish Terrier, Miss Beazley, who later died in 2014.

Barney and Miss Beazley are honored with a bronze sculpture at the George W. Bush Library. A bronze Barney also appears in the arms of Bush's statue in Rapid City, South Dakota's "City of Presidents" public art installation of presidential statues.

Filmography
Barney has starred in eleven government film productions. His last, Barney Cam VII: A Red, White and Blue Christmas, is a 2008 Christmas video featuring George W. Bush and members of his immediate family, and many American Olympians. In it, he dreams of winning several honors for the United States before being woken up by President Bush, who needs Barney's help in preparing for Christmas.

Barney's feature videos:

See also
 India – President George W. Bush's cat
 Fala – FDR's Scottish Terrier
 United States presidential pets
 List of individual dogs

References

External links

 Barney's official site — archived copy of George W. Bush White House site

2000 animal births
2013 animal deaths
Deaths from cancer in Texas
Deaths from lymphoma
George W. Bush
United States presidential dogs

fr:Animaux domestiques des présidents des États-Unis#Barney